"I Wish I Had Never Met Sunshine" is a country music song written by Gene Autry, Dale Evans, and Oakley Haldeman. It was sung by Gene Autry and released on the Columbia label (catalog no. 36970). In May 1946, it reached No. 3 on the Billboard folk chart. It was also ranked as the No. 13 record in Billboard's 1946 year-end folk juke box chart.

The song was later covered by other artists, including Johnny Cash and June Carter Cash (duet), Tex Ritter, Roy Rogers, and Wesley Tuttle.

See also
 Billboard Most-Played Folk Records of 1946

References

Gene Autry songs
1946 songs
Songs written by Gene Autry